Jeungpyeong County (Jeungpyeong-gun) is a county in North Chungcheong Province, South Korea.

Location
Jeungpyeong is in the centrally located in Chungcheongbuk-do. It is located East of Jincheon, West of Goesan, south of Eumseong, north of Cheongwon.

Symbols
 county tree: Ginkgo tree
 county bird: Snowy Egret
 county flower: White Magnolia

History
 1990, 12, 31 : Chungcheongbuk-do JeungPyeong local office is construct of Goesan-gun jeungpyeong eup, doan myeon.
 2003, 8, 30 : Jeungpyeong local office is raised to Jeungpyeong-gun, and it became independence from Goesan-gun.

Education
JeungPyeong is the site of several school and tertiary institution, including:

Elementary school
JeungpYeong Elementary School
SamBo Elementary School
DoAn Elementary School
JukRi Elementary School

Middle school
HyeongSeok Middle School]
JeungpYeong Informations High School]
JeungpYeong Technical High School]

High school
HyeongSeok High School
JeungpYeong Informations High School
JeungpYeong Girl's Middle School

Tertiary Institution
Korea National University of Transportation

Climate
Jeungpyeong has a monsoon-influenced humid continental climate (Köppen: Dwa) with cold, dry winters and hot, rainy summers.

Twin towns – sister cities

Jeungpyeong is twinned with:

  Guannan County, Jiangsu, China

References

External links
Jeungpyeong County government home page

Counties of North Chungcheong Province